Hu Guangyong (1823–1885), better known by his courtesy name Xueyan, was a businessman in China during the latter Qing dynasty. He was active in banking, real estate, shipping and Chinese medicine. He was involved in the salt, tea, clothing, grain as well as the arms trade.

Hu was the only person of the merchant class in the Qing dynasty to be awarded a red-topped hat, a rank indicating an officer of second grade by the Qing imperial court. He was also one of the few people given express permission by Empress Dowager Cixi to ride a horse in the Forbidden City.

Biography 

Born in 1823 in Jixi County, Anhui Province, in 1837, the 14-year-old Hu moved to Hangzhou to be apprenticed to a private bank which would later become the foundation of his Fukang Bank. Through a series of events, at 26 years of age, he became friends with a local salt magnate, Wang Youling. He borrowed 500 taels of silver in bank drafts to help Wang run for office. This would cement Wang as Hu's political ally, a relationship that Hu would lean on during his rise to wealth.

Twelve years later, in 1860, Wang became the governor of Zhejiang. In gratitude for Hu's help early on his campaign, Wang campaigned hard to help Hu start more private banks. The following year, the Taiping Rebellion reached Hangzhou. Hu used his considerable influence to transport food and arms to the city. However, by the end of the year, Hangzhou fell due to the lack of food. Wang committed suicide, leaving Hu without an ally. At the age of 39, Hu eventually found an ally in General Tso, the new viceroy and Governor-General of Fujian and Zhejiang. He won Tso's trust by paying for Tso's army's rations and salaries. He later became General Tso's financier in all his military efforts.

In 1866, he funded Foochow Arsenal, China's first modern shipyard and naval academy. After General Tso accepted a position as Governor-General of Shaanxi and Gansu, Hu ran the naval academy in Tso's stead. To aid in the movement of Tso's troops and its military expedition against the Muslim rebels in Xinjiang and later the Russians (known as the Ili Crisis), Hu, then being in charge of the Shanghai Transportation and Procurement Bureau, raised up to 15,950,000 taels of silver in debt from HSBC - HSBC's first public loan in China. As a result, Tso was victorious, and Hu was awarded the red-topped hat by the Imperial Court for his efforts.

Along the way, Hu set up various other businesses, ranging from banks to pawnshops.  After being recognised by the Qing government for his achievements, Hu also began to engage in more philanthropic activities. His best known contribution that still stands to this day is the medicinal hall Hu Qing Yu Tang. It was known then for its uncompromising quality in medicine, ethical treatment of customers and cheap healthcare. It was said that Hu himself personally exchanged a peasant's medicine after being complained to. It was his ethics that propelled his fame.

Later in life, Hu tried to corner the silk trade, leading to a boycott led by the French. In 1883, after being forced to sell silk, he began to experience cash flow problems. There were runs on his bank, and he finally filed for bankruptcy in 1884. Within a year, Hu died of depression at age 62.

Hu's former residence is now a tourist attraction in Hangzhou. It was opened to the public in 2001 after restoration.

Accomplishments 

Hu Xueyan is known in modern China for these accomplishments:

 Funded the modernization of the Chinese army
 Founded the pharmaceutical company Hu Qing Yu Tang
 Retrieved cultural relics from outside China (mostly Japan)
 Ethics of a businessman

Popular culture

 Fragrance of Osmanthus of August - Taiwanese TV Movie
 Red Topped Hat Businessman - 25 episode Chinese TV series

References

Sources

Further reading 

 
 Notes that Hu's manipulation of the silk trade may have caused a financial crisis in the late 1880s.

Politicians from Xuancheng
1823 births
1885 deaths
Qing dynasty politicians from Anhui
Chinese bankers
Businesspeople from Anhui
Businesspeople from Hangzhou
19th-century Chinese businesspeople